Upbeat (also sometimes referred to as UpBeat or Up Beat) is a 1999 live and studio album by the Fred Frith Guitar Quartet, an American-based contemporary classical and experimental music guitar quartet comprising Fred Frith, René Lussier, Nick Didkovsky and Mark Stewart. It is their second album, after Ayaya Moses (1997), and was released by Canadian record label, Ambiances Magnétiques. The live material was drawn from concerts the quartet had performed in Germany, Switzerland, France and Spain in November 1997. The studio tracks were recorded at Tonstudio Amann in Vienna, Austria, also in November 1997.

The album comprises pieces composed by each of the four members of the quartet, played solo and in the group, plus additional pieces improvised by the quartet. Frith's "No Bones" is an adaption of his song "Bones" from Massacre's 1981 album, Killing Time.

Reception

In a review of Upbeat at AllMusic Tom Schulte described the tracks on the album as "angular, mathematical, and extemporaneous". He wrote that each of the four guitarists demonstrate what can be done with the instrument, and then, as a quartet, "take it to the fourth power". Reviewing the album in the Canadian Sunday Herald, Stephen Pedersen called the quartet "a delightfully wild and wooly bunch", who are "superb masters of their instruments and intensely in tune with each other". He said they explore the percussive and rhythmic nature of the guitar, and blend noise with folk, jazz and country music to produce an "intriguing CD" of "brilliant effects".

Writing in The Wire, Mike Barnes complimented Frith on the "admirable restraint" he displays in his quartet—as if he "is waiting [for] something to say"—but added that Upbeat "certainly says a great deal". Barnes said that, not unexpectedly, the album's sources are difficult to identify, but he felt there is "a lot of the subversion" targeting country and western music. "Speedy Feety" has a "[c]ountry feel", and becomes overly sentimental in "Red Rag", which Barnes described as "a corny melody set against a gauzy, blurred backdrop".

Reviewing the album in Coda magazine, James Hale said Frith, Didkovsky, Stewart and Lussier each have one thing in common: they "share a passion for exploring the sonic possibilities" of the electric guitar. Hale described Upbeat as part "catchy phrases and speaker-shredding sound".  He added that the quartet's "real power" is that they have not "forgotten the fun of plugging in an electric guitar for the first time. When they all pick up on an idea and begin extrapolating ... it's a guitar-lover's dream come true."

Track listing
All music by the Fred Frith Guitar Quartet, except where noted.

Sources: Liner notes, Discogs, Fred Frith discography.

Personnel
Fred Frith – electric guitar
René Lussier – electric guitar
Nick Didkovsky – electric guitar
Mark Stewart – electric guitar
Sources: Liner notes, Discogs, Fred Frith discography.

Sound and artwork
Live recordings by Emmanuel Gilot
Studio recordings by Christoph Amann
Mastered by Marc Fortin and René Lussier
Mastered by Peter Hardt
Produced by Fred Frith
Photography by Heike Liss
Illustrations by Finn Timo Liss
Graphic design by Jean-François Denis and Luc Beauchemin
Sources: Liner notes, Discogs, Fred Frith discography.

References

External links
Upbeat at Ambiances Magnétiques

1999 albums
1999 live albums
Fred Frith Guitar Quartet albums